Guber may refer to:

Jasminka Guber (born 1985), Bosnian middle-distance runner
Lee Guber (1920–1988), American theater impresario
Peter Guber (born 1942), American business executive, entrepreneur, educator, and author
Rebeca Guber (1926–2020), Argentine mathematician, university professor, textbook author
Rivka Guber (1902–1981), Israeli social worker and pioneer, recipient of the Israel Prize

See also
Guber-Peters Entertainment Company, American game show production company
Mali Guber, village in the municipality of Livno, Bosnia and Herzegovina
Veliki Guber, village in the municipality of Livno, Bosnia and Herzegovina